Supporting People is a UK government programme helping vulnerable people in England and Wales live independently and help them to remain in their home. Initially, it was to help tenants maintain their social housing tenancies, but it has since been broadened to provide housing related support for anyone regardless of housing status. This includes private and social tenants, home owners, homeless people and those in temporary accommodation as well as people in sheltered accommodation or other specialist housing. 
It is run by local government and provided by the voluntary sector. It was launched on 1 April 2003. 

In England, it falls under the responsibility of Dept of Communities and Local Government who provide help to Local Authorities to run provide support programmes.

In Wales, Supporting People is administrated by the Welsh Assembly Government 
The aims of the Supporting People Programme in Wales are:
 helping vulnerable people live as independently as possible
 providing people with the help they need to live in their own homes, hostels, sheltered housing or other specialist housing
 preventing problems in the first place or providing help as early as possible in order to reduce demand on other services such as health and social services
 providing help to complement the personal or medical care that some people may need
 putting those who need support at the heart of the programme
 ensuring quality services, which are delivered as efficiently and effectively as possible through joint working between organisations that plan and fund services and those that provide services
 providing funding for support based on need
 promoting equality and reducing inequalities.

In Wales, a Supporting People Outcomes Framework has been developed to target and monitor the support provided. The aim of the Outcomes Framework is to help understand what Supporting People services achieve and to measure the impact support interventions have on those who receive services.
The Welsh Government, local authorities and housing related support providers have been working in partnership to develop an outcomes framework.
The collection of outcomes based data has been compulsory for Supporting People funded services since 1 April 2012.

External links 
Supporting People in Wales

Public housing in England
Programmes of the Government of the United Kingdom
Poverty in England
Local government in England
2003 establishments in England
Public policy in England